Wan Hashim bin Wan Teh is a Malaysian politician from UMNO. He was the Member of Parliament for Gerik from 2004 to 2008.

Early career 
He was former lecturer of UKM before he became a politician. He is now the dean of Faculty of Defence Management Studies of National Defence University of Malaysia.

Political career 
In 2004, he was nominated to compete 2004 Malaysian general election for Gerik and won the seat against the PAS candidate, Ramli Tusin.

Election results

Honours
 :
 Companion of the Order of Loyalty to the Crown of Malaysia (J.S.M.) (1999)
  :
  Knight Commander of the Order of the Perak State Crown (DPMP) – Dato' (1991)

References 

United Malays National Organisation politicians
Academic staff of the National University of Malaysia
Living people
Companions of the Order of Loyalty to the Crown of Malaysia
Year of birth missing (living people)